Carlos Alcaraz defeated Daniil Medvedev in the final, 6–3, 6–2 to win the men's singles tennis title at the 2023 Indian Wells Masters. He did not drop a set en route to his third ATP Tour Masters 1000 title and eighth career title overall. With the win, he usurped Novak Djokovic for the ATP No. 1 ranking, who was unable to enter the United States due to being unvaccinated for COVID-19. With this victory, Alcaraz ended Medvedev's 19-match winning streak.

Taylor Fritz was the defending champion, but lost in the quarterfinals to Jannik Sinner.

Rafael Nadal withdrew from the tournament due to a left leg injury. As a result, he will drop out of the top 10 in the ATP rankings for the first time since his top 10 debut in 2005, ending a record streak of 912 weeks.

Seeds 
All seeds received a bye into the second round.

Draw

Finals

Top half

Section 1

Section 2

Section 3

Section 4

Bottom half

Section 5

Section 6

Section 7

Section 8

Seeded players 
The following are the seeded players. Seedings are based on ATP rankings as of March 6, 2023. Rankings and points before are as of March 6, 2023.

Withdrawn players
The following players would have been seeded, but withdrew before the tournament began.

Other entry information

Wildcards 

Source:

Protected ranking

Withdrawals 
 Before the tournament

Qualifying

Seeds

Qualifiers

Lucky losers

Qualifying draw

First qualifier

Second qualifier

Third qualifier

Fourth qualifier

Fifth qualifier

Sixth qualifier

Seventh qualifier

Eighth qualifier

Ninth qualifier

Tenth qualifier

Eleventh qualifier

Twelfth qualifier

References

External links 
Main draw
Qualifying draw

2023 ATP Tour
singles